Childhood disintegrative disorder (CDD), also known as Heller's syndrome and disintegrative psychosis, is a rare condition characterized by late onset of developmental delays—or severe and sudden reversals—in language (receptive and expressive), social engagement, bowel and bladder, play and motor skills. Researchers have not been successful in finding a cause for the disorder. CDD has some similarity to autism and is sometimes considered a low-functioning form of it. In May 2013, CDD, along with other sub-types of PDD (Asperger's syndrome, autism, rett's disorder and PDD-NOS), was fused into a single diagnostic term called "autism spectrum disorder" under the new DSM-5 manual.

CDD was originally described by Austrian educator Theodor Heller (1869–1938) in 1908, 35 years before Leo Kanner and Hans Asperger described autism. Heller had previously used the name dementia infantilis for the syndrome.

An apparent period of fairly normal development is often noted before a regression in skills or a series of regressions in skills. The age at which this regression can occur varies, after three years of normal development is typical. The regression, known as a 'prodrome,' can be so dramatic that the child may be aware of it, and may in its beginning even ask, vocally, what is happening to them. Some children describe or appear to be reacting to hallucinations, but the most obvious symptom is that skills apparently attained are lost.

Many children are already somewhat delayed when the disorder becomes apparent, but these delays are not always obvious in young children. This has been described by many writers as a devastating condition, affecting both the family and the individual's future. As is the case with all pervasive developmental disorder categories, there is considerable controversy about the right treatment for CDD.

Signs and symptoms
CDD is a rare condition, with only 1.7 cases per 100,000.

A child affected with childhood disintegrative disorder shows normal development. Up until this point, the child has developed normally in the areas of language skills, social skills, comprehension skills, and has maintained those skills for about two years. However, between the ages of two and 10, skills acquired are lost almost completely in at least two of the following six functional areas:
 Expressive language skills (being able to produce speech and communicate a message)
 Receptive language skills (comprehension of language – listening and understanding what is communicated)
 Social skills and self care skills
 Control over bowel and bladder
 Play skills
 Motor skills

Lack of normal function or impairment also occurs in at least two of the following three areas:
 Social interaction
 Communication
 Repetitive behavior and interest patterns

In her book, Thinking in Pictures, Temple Grandin argues that compared to "Kanner's classic autism" and to Asperger syndrome, CDD is characterized with more severe sensory processing disorder but less severe cognitive problems. She also argues that compared to most autistic individuals, persons with CDD have more severe speech pathology and they usually do not respond well to stimulants.

Causes
All of the causes of childhood disintegrative disorder are still unknown. Sometimes CDD surfaces abruptly within days or weeks, while in other cases it develops over a longer period of time. A Mayo Clinic report indicates: "Comprehensive medical and neurological examinations in children diagnosed with childhood disintegrative disorder seldom uncover an underlying medical or neurological cause. Although the occurrence of epilepsy is higher in children with childhood disintegrative disorder, experts don't know whether epilepsy plays a role in causing the disorder."

CDD, especially in cases of later age of onset, has also been associated with certain other conditions, particularly the following:
 Lipid storage diseases: In this condition, a toxic buildup of excess fats (lipids) takes place in the brain and nervous system.
 Subacute sclerosing panencephalitis: Chronic infection of the brain by a form of the measles virus causes subacute sclerosing panencephalitis. This condition leads to brain inflammation and the death of nerve cells.
 Tuberous sclerosis (TSC): TSC is a genetic disorder. In this disorder, tumors may grow in the brain and other vital organs like kidneys, heart, eyes, lungs, and skin. In this condition, noncancerous (benign) tumors, hamartomas, grow in the brain.
  Leukodystrophy: In this condition, the myelin sheath does not develop in a normal way, causing white matter in the brain to eventually fail and disintegrate.

Treatment

Loss of language and skills related to social interaction and self-care are serious. The affected children face ongoing disabilities in certain areas and require long-term care. Treatment of CDD involves both behavior therapy, environmental therapy and medications.
 Behavior therapy: Applied Behavior Analysis (ABA) is considered to be the most effective form of treatment for Autism spectrum disorders by the American Academy of Pediatrics. The primary goal of ABA is to improve quality of life, and independence by teaching adaptive behaviors to children with autism, and to diminish problematic behaviors like running away from home, or self-injury by using positive or negative reinforcement to encourage or discourage behaviors over time.
 Environmental Therapy: Sensory Enrichment Therapy uses enrichment of the sensory experience to improve symptoms in autism, many of which are common to CDD.
 Medications: There are no medications available to directly treat CDD. Antipsychotic medications are used to treat severe behavior problems like aggressive stance and repetitive behavior patterns. Anticonvulsant medications are used to control seizures.

References

Further reading
 
 
 Dobbs, David (2016). "The most terrifying childhood condition you've never heard of." Spectrum 6 July 2016, accessed 6 May 2017 at &wteswitched=1

External links 
 NIH/Medline

Pervasive developmental disorders
Neurological disorders in children
Learning disabilities
Autism spectrum disorders